Puerto Asís is a Colombian city in Putumayo Department. Bordering Ecuador, Puerto Asís is one of the department's largest cities, with a population of nearly 106,000.

History 

Puerto Asís was founded on May 3, 1912, by the Capuchins Missionaries, led by Father Estanislao de las Cortes and Brother Hidelfonso de Tulcán. The city bears the name of Saint Francis's birthplace—Assisi.

In order to reaffirm the sovereignty of Colombia in the territories that were contested by Peru, the government located programs in the region that contributed to the town's growth.

By April 1914, the village had a population of more than 200; however, excluding children, women, or indigenous people. The population continued to increase. The mission opened a boarding school for the education of the local indigenous population and the colonists' children. Later that same year, The Franciscan Sisters took charge of the school.

The city celebrates Carnival each year in January, beginning with a Tyre Regatta on January 3 in the Putumayo River. This became a major tourist attraction.

Culture 

Each day of Carnival features a separate color. January 4 is multicolored; the 5th is black; the 6th is white and end with the coronation of the carnival queen on the 7th.

The town celebrates its founding on May 3.

The Puerto Asis fair has historically been recognized as ranch day. It includes horseback riding and livestock exhibitions.

Climate
Puerto Asís has a tropical rainforest climate (Af) with heavy to very heavy rainfall year-round.

External links 

 Government of Puerto Asis official website 
 Environmental information of amazon colombian

References

Municipalities of Putumayo Department